Zašovice is a municipality and village in Třebíč District in the Vysočina Region of the Czech Republic. It has about 100 inhabitants.

Administrative parts
The village of Nová Brtnice is an administrative part of Zašovice.

References

Villages in Třebíč District